The Ballard Terminal Railroad Company LLC  operates two Class III short line terminal railroads in western Washington, United States. Founded in 1997 to operate a three-mile spur through Seattle's Ballard neighborhood, the Ballard Terminal Railroad has expanded to operate two additional lines in the Puget Sound area, including Eastside Freight Railroad  from Snohomish to Woodinville, Washington, and Meeker Southern Railroad , a  segment from East Puyallup ("Meeker") to McMillin, Washington. Eastside Freight Railroad has ceased operation as of mid 2020.

Foundation
Burlington Northern Santa Fe Railway stopped offering service on a three-mile spur through Seattle's Ballard neighborhood in January 1997 because only three companies were buying rail shipments, a traffic volume too low to sustain the line according to BNSF. To ensure continued rail service, the three previous customers served by the spur and a fourth company joined with other investors to form the Ballard Terminal Railroad Company, LLC in 1997. The Ballard Terminal Railroad refurbished two locomotives and approached the state of Washington seeking approximately $300,000 in financing to refurbish the track. The railroad began operation in early 1998 with a 1940s-era locomotive formerly belonging to the Milwaukee Road.

Locomotives
 Ballard Terminal Railroad operates one locomotive, an EMD SW1 locomotive numbered 98 formerly owned by Milwaukee Road. The locomotive's black, red and silver livery and nickname, "Li'l Beaver", pay tribute to the colors and mascot of nearby Ballard High School.

Eastside Freight Railroad once operated an EMD SW1200 locomotive now numbered MSN 109 built in 1963 for the Missouri Pacific. Eastside Freight purchased the locomotive from Tacoma Rail in 2009, which had it listed as surplus property.

Meeker Southern Railroad operates an EMD SW9 locomotive numbered 103.

Routes
The Ballard Terminal Railroad operates three rail lines in the greater Seattle area.

Ballard Terminal

The Ballard Terminal Railroad spur begins at its connection to the BNSF mainline at the Shilshole yard just north of N.W. 68th Street. The line follows a route along Seaview Avenue N.W. toward Shilshole Ave N.W. which the line parallels until N.W. 45th Street. The line follows N.W. 45th Street until Leary Way N.W., which the line then parallels, passing the Bright Street Yard, then reaching its terminus at N.W. 40th Street and 6th Ave N.W. near the border between the Ballard and Fremont neighborhoods. This route runs parallel to and has multiple crossings with the Burke–Gilman Trail. The Ballard Terminal Railroad owns its tracks outright, but has a 30-year lease on the land underneath, which belongs to the city of Seattle. Most of the railroad was originally part of the Great Northern Railway's main line, moved to the west when the Lake Washington Ship Canal was built.

Meeker Southern
Meeker Southern Railroad's segment runs  from East Puyallup ("Meeker") to McMillin, Washington.

Eastside Freight
Eastside Freight Railroad, which started operation in 2009 on the former BNSF Railway's Woodinville Subdivision, is a segment from Snohomish to Woodinville.   Eastside Freight Railroad has ceased operation as of mid 2020.

Eastside Rail Corridor

On April 1, 2013, Ballard Terminal Railroad filed a federal lawsuit aimed at preventing the City of Kirkland from converting the section of the Eastside Rail Corridor which passes through the city into a trail. On May 3, 2013, Federal District Court Judge Marsha Pechman granted the City of Kirkland's motion to dismiss the case filed by Ballard Terminal Railroad Company seeking to prevent rail salvage on the Cross Kirkland Corridor. In her oral ruling, Judge Pechman stated the Federal District Court did not have jurisdiction to consider Ballard's temporary restraining order (TRO) and that the Surface Transportation Board was the proper forum for adjudicating Ballard's claims. On August 1, 2013, the Surface Transportation Board denied the request by Ballard Terminal Railroad Company to block rail removal along the Cross Kirkland Corridor.

Operations
As of 2008, the Ballard Terminal Railroad serves only one customer on the Ballard Spur, Salmon Bay Sand and Gravel. BNSF delivers cars containing cement, fly ash, stucco and mortar to the Shilshole Yard; the Ballard Terminal Railroad then delivers these cars to Salmon Bay Sand and Gravel two to three times per week, typically at night.

Awards
In 2007 the Ballard Terminal Railroad received the Jake Award With Distinction, a safety award given by the American Short Line and Regional Railroad Association to railroads with no reportable injuries.

References

Switching and terminal railroads
Transportation in Seattle
Washington (state) railroads
Spin-offs of the BNSF Railway